Hemeroplanis incusalis is a species of moth in the family Erebidae.

References

Further reading

 
 
 

Boletobiinae
Articles created by Qbugbot
Moths described in 1881